The Women's Javelin Throw event at the 1980 Summer Olympics in Moscow, Soviet Union had an entry list of 22 competitors, with two qualifying groups (22 throwers) before the final (12) took place on Friday July 25, 1980. The top 12 and ties, and all those reaching 60.00 metres advanced to the final. All results were made with a rough surfaced javelin (old design).

Medalists

Schedule
All times are Moscow Time (UTC+3)

Abbreviations
All results shown are in metres

Qualification

Group A

Group B

Final

See also
 1978 Women's European Championships Javelin Throw (Prague)
 1982 Women's European Championships Javelin Throw (Athens)
 1983 Women's World Championships Javelin Throw (Helsinki)
 1986 Women's European Championships Javelin Throw (Stuttgart)

References

External links
  Results

J
Javelin throw at the Olympics
1980 in women's athletics
Women's events at the 1980 Summer Olympics